Igor Valeryevich Shapovalov (born 5 February 1985) is a former Russian professional football player.

Club career
He made his professional debut for FC Chernomorets Novorossiysk on 20 August 2003 in a Russian Premier League Cup semifinal against FC Shinnik Yaroslavl. On 14 October 2003, he played his second game for Chernomorets in a Russian Cup game against FC Terek Grozny.

Honours
 Russian Premier League Cup finalist: 2003.

External links
 
 

1985 births
Living people
Russian footballers
Association football midfielders
PFC Krylia Sovetov Samara players
FC Chernomorets Novorossiysk players
FC Smena Komsomolsk-na-Amure players